The Reader is a 1988 French film directed by Michel Deville. The film won that year's Louis Delluc Prize, and was nominated for nine César Awards including Best Supporting Actor, won by Patrick Chesnais.

Plot 
Constance is a young French woman who is dissatisfied with her mundane life but has a talent for reading stories to others. As the movie opens, she is reading a book called La Lectrice to her boyfriend, in which the main character, a woman named Marie, reads literature to others for a living. She becomes engrossed in the book to the point that she begins imagining herself as Marie: Constance and Marie are played by Miou-Miou, and the movie weaves back and forth between their stories.

Marie embarks on her new profession with gusto. As she reads to her clients, all of whom are seeking a little more than the solace of literature, she works a fantastical transformation on them. Her clients include the widow of a Marxist general (María Casares), a nervous businessman (Patrick Chesnais), a retired magistrate, and a handicapped teenage boy. Soon the clients' friends and families become involved, as does her professor (Christian Blanc). The general's widow's maidservant and the boy's friends from school become affected by the readings, and Constance has an affair with the businessman. Books read include The Lover (by Marguerite Duras, read to the sexually frustrated businessman), and the works of Marquis de Sade (read to the judge and his libertine friends).

Cast
 Miou-Miou as Constance / Marie
 Régis Royer as Éric
 Maria Casarès as The General's widow
 Patrick Chesnais as The CEO
 Pierre Dux as Magistrat
 Christian Ruché as Jean / Philippe
 Brigitte Catillon as Éric's mother
 Marianne Denicourt as Bella B.
 Charlotte Farran as Coralie
 Clotilde de Bayser as Coralie's mother
 Jean-Luc Boutté as The Inspector
 Simon Eine as The professor
 Maria de Medeiros as The nurse
 André Wilms as The man of the Saint-Landry street
 Sylvie Laporte as Françoise
 Léo Campion as The grandfather

Awards and nominations
César Awards (France)
Won: Best Actor – Supporting Role (Patrick Chesnais)
Nominated: Best Actress – Leading Role (Miou-Miou)
Nominated: Best Actress – Supporting Role (María Casares)
Nominated: Best Director (Michel Deville) 
Nominated: Best Editing (Raymonde Guyot)
Nominated: Best Film
Nominated: Best Poster (Benjamin Baltimore) 
Nominated: Best Production Design (Thierry Leproust)
Nominated: Best Screenplay (Michel or Rosalinde Deville)
Louis Delluc Prize (France)
Won: Best Film
National Board of Review (U.S.)
Nominated: Best Foreign Language Film

The film was selected as the French entry for the Best Foreign Language Film at the 61st Academy Awards, but was not accepted as a nominee.

See also
 List of submissions to the 61st Academy Awards for Best Foreign Language Film
 List of French submissions for the Academy Award for Best Foreign Language Film

References

External links

 La lectrice at filmsdefrance
 

1988 films
1980s French-language films
1988 comedy-drama films
French comedy-drama films
Films featuring a Best Supporting Actor César Award-winning performance
Louis Delluc Prize winners
Films directed by Michel Deville
1980s French films